SN 1998aq is a nearby supernova located in the intermediate spiral galaxy NGC 3982, offset  west and  of the galactic nucleus. It was discovered April 13, 1998 by amateur astronomer Mark Armstrong and was confirmed by fellow British amateur Ron Arbour; both members of the U.K. Supernova/Nova Patrol. The event was not visible on a prior check by Armstrong made April 7. It reached peak brightness on April 27, and 15 days later had declined by 1.14 magnitudes in the B (blue) band.

Spectroscopic observations determined this was a Type Ia supernova event, and it became one of the best-studied supernova of its type, at least in the visual band. An absorption feature of singly-ionized carbon was (probably) detected nine days before maximum, an indication of unburned ash left over from the original carbon-oxygen core of the progenitor white dwarf. Brightness calibration using Cepheid variables in NGC 3982 gives a peak absolute magnitude estimate of at least −19.47 (assuming no extinction in the host galaxy).

References

External links
 Light curves and spectra  on the Open Supernova Catalog
 SN 1998aq in NGC 3982

Supernovae
Astronomical objects discovered in 1998
Ursa Major (constellation)